The Iron-grass Natural Temperate Grassland of South Australia is a temperate grassland in the southeast of South Australia that stretches from Orroroo in the north, to Strathalbyn in the south, just straddling the eastern fringes of Adelaide's Mount Lofty Ranges. Listed as Critically Endangered under the EPBC Act, the grasslands predominantly feature Iron-grasses (Lomandra species).

They are distinguished from other grasslands of southeastern Australia because they are frequently dominated by Lomandra species (Iron-grasses) which are tussocks in the Asparagaceae family, rather than actual grasses.

Geography

The vegetation community is mostly found within the Flinders-Lofty Block Bioregion, with minor presence in the Kanmantoo, Eyre Yorke Block and Murray Darling Depression Bioregions. The residue patches alter in size from less than 1 hectare to large blocks of 100 ha or more. 

They area distributed in the transition zone between the higher rainfall woodlands and the drier Mallee areas at the base of the eastern Mount Lofty Ranges to the Mallee, and from Callington northwards to Terowie.
The distribution of the Iron-grass Natural Temperate Grassland is located within various Aboriginal Nations, including lands of the Ngarrindjeri, Peramangk, Kaurna, Narrunga, Nukunu and Ngadjuri people.

Ecology

In the community, Lomandra multiflora and Lomandra effusa predominantly occur alongside perennial, tussock-forming native grasses, which cover 70 per cent of the area. Grasses include Austrodanthonia and Austrostipa species, and as well as Austrodanthonia tenuior and Dianella longifolia. Wildflowers and forbs include Acanthocladium dockeri, Caladenia colorata, Dodonaea procumbens, Eryngium ovinum, Swainsona behriana, Arthropodium strictum, Triptilodiscus pygmaeus, Chrysocephalum apiculatum, Convolvulus erubescens, Goodenia pinnatifida, Bulbine bulbosa, Einadia nutans, Wurmbea dioica, Velleia paradoxa, Swainsona behriana, Vittadinia gracilis and Wahlenbergia luteola.  

Trees and gangling shrubs are devoid to sparse and would cover less than 10 per cent of the community, in addition to being mostly associated with contiguous woodlands. The sparse tree species are Allocasuarina verticillata, Acacia pycnantha, Eucalyptus leucoxylon, Eucalyptus odorata and Eucalyptus porosa, and the few shrubs include Bursaria spinosa, Enchylaena tomentosa, Eutaxia microphylla and Maireana brevifolia. These grasslands are possibly traced from dissipated grassy woodlands, which also occur in the dispersion range of Iron-grass Natural Temperate Grassland. The region features loam to clay loam soils usually found on soft to precipitous slopes of hills and stony ridgelines.

Animals
Mammals, birds, reptiles, insects, spiders and other invertebrates influence the necessary ecological procedure of the grassland, with Macropus fuliginosus, Chalinolobus gouldii, Chalinolobus morio, Tadarida australis, Dromaius novaehollandiae, Aprasia pseudopulchella, Aprasia pseudopulchella, Tiliqua adelaidensis, Pedionomus torquatus and Eolophus roseicapillus being the most recorded species. The state vulnerable Ardeotis australis, Pedionomus torquatus and Trapezites luteus have also been observed in the Grassland. Birds include Cincloramphus cruralis, Corvus mellori, Pedionomus torquatus, Aquila audax, Cracticus tibicen, Ocyphaps lophotes, Phaps chalcoptera, Coturnix pectoralis and Turnix velox.

See also
Adelaide Plains

Notes

References

Geography of Adelaide
Grasslands of Australia
Remnant urban bushland
Vegetation of Australia
Temperate grasslands, savannas, and shrublands
Environment of South Australia
Endangered Ecological Community